The 1996 UCI Track Cycling World Cup Classics is a multi-race tournament over a season of track cycling. The World Cup is organised by the UCI.

Results

Men

Women

References

Results from wiki in Catalan
Round 1, Cali
Round 2, Havanna
Round 4, Busto Garolfo
Round 5, Cottbus

World Cup Classics
UCI Track Cycling World Cup
20th century in Cottbus